Variovorax guangxiensis is an aerobic bacterium from the genus of Variovorax which has been isolated from rhizosphere soil of a banana tree (Musa paradisiaca) from Guangxi in China. Variovorax guangxiensis produces 1-aminocyclopropane-1-carboxylate deaminase.

References

Comamonadaceae
Bacteria described in 2015